Qalandar in Sufism is used as a title for some Sufi saints. Some people for whom the title is used are Lal Shahbaz Qalandar, Bu Ali Shah Qalandar, Shams Ali Qalandar, Rabia Basri, 
Nathar tabre Aalam qalandar,
Baba Fakruddin qalandar and Qalandar Baba Auliya.
Makhdom Mehmood Mastwar Qalander **Qalandar Ishfaq (Qalandarm Mastam) Muree*

A Qalandar is a person who has excelled in seeing things and advances stage by stage into the Being. He even rises above the Administrative System and witnesses the core of Oneness in detail and after enjoying the Unity of the Being returns without losing his grades and then reaches back into his humanly status, so much so that his rise and fall becomes one and the same thing for him.. He witnesses part in the whole and sees the whole in the part and, then, after detaching himself from all this, plunges into a state of ecstasy.

The status of a qalandar is even higher than the loved ones because duality remains there even in that state, i.e. one is the loved one and the other is the loving. In qalanderiyat there is no duality.

Qalandar is a title given to a saint who is at a very high level of spirituality. They are different from other saints and have very strong feelings of love for God's creation. Qalandars, among the saints, are those persons who may enjoy freedom from the ties and bounds of time and space. It is claimed that all living things are given in their charge and command, every part of the universe may be at their disposal but these holy people are far above temptation, greed or lust. When people request them they feel duty-bound to listen and rectify the cause of miseries of people because they have been appointed by God for this very purpose.

Qalandars have always spread the message of love and humanity, they are always in the state of ecstasy and their actions are with the will of God. They are Wali Allah. Among contemporary people who hold the title of qalandar are Shams Ali Qalandar of Punjab, Pakistan, Shahbaz Qalander, Nathar Vali, Baba Fakruddin, and Qalander Baba Auliya,.

In One Thousand and One Nights, Scheherezade recounts the tales of the three Calendars (alternate spelling).

See also

 Dervish
 Fakir
 Qalandar (caste)
 Qalandariyah
 Lal Shahbaz Qalandar
 Mast Qalandar
 Rabia Basri
 Tando Jahania
 Sadhu
 Majzoob

References

Sources
 

Asceticism
Islam in Pakistan
Islamic honorifics
Islam in India